Uzlovaya is a town and the administrative center of Uzlovsky District in Tula Oblast, Russia. Population:

History
It was founded in 1873 as Khrushchyovskaya railway station. It was renamed Uzlovaya in 1877 and granted town status in 1938. The railway influenced much the life and the future of the town.

Administrative and municipal status
Within the framework of administrative divisions, Uzlovaya serves as the administrative center of Uzlovsky District. As an administrative division, it is incorporated within Uzlovsky District as Uzlovaya Town Under District Jurisdiction. As a municipal division, Uzlovaya Town Under District Jurisdiction is incorporated within Uzlovsky Municipal District as Uzlovaya Urban Settlement.

Economy
The station connects three important railway directions: Ryazhsk, Yelets, and Tula. The first coal mines were founded in the late 1930s.

Notable people
Vasiliy Podshibyakin, geologist

References

Sources

Notes

Cities and towns in Tula Oblast